Gymnanthes glandulosa is a species of plant in the family Euphorbiaceae. It is found in Cuba and Jamaica.

References

Hippomaneae
Vulnerable plants
Taxonomy articles created by Polbot
Plants described in 1800